Eka Febri Yogi Setiawan (born 29 February 2000) is an Indonesian professional footballer who plays as a defensive midfielder for Liga 1 club PSIS Semarang.

Club career

PSIS Semarang
He was signed for PSIS Semarang to play in Liga 1 in the 2019 season. Eka Febri made his first-team debut on 11 September 2019 in a match against PSM Makassar at the Andi Mattalatta Stadium, Makassar.

International career
In October 2021, Eka Febri was called up to the Indonesia U23 in a friendly match against Tajikistan and Nepal and also prepared for 2022 AFC U-23 Asian Cup qualification in Tajikistan by Shin Tae-yong.

Career statistics

Club

Notes

References

External links
 Eka Febri Setiawan at Soccerway

2000 births
Living people
Indonesian footballers
Liga 1 (Indonesia) players
PSIS Semarang players
Association football midfielders
People from Tuban
Sportspeople from East Java